Cody Andrews (born 6 September 1987) is a New Zealand cricketer. He made his List A debut on 20 January 2016 in the 2015–16 Ford Trophy. He made his first-class debut for Auckland on 5 November 2016 in the 2016–17 Plunket Shield season.

References

External links
 

1987 births
Living people
New Zealand cricketers
Auckland cricketers
Northern Districts cricketers
Cricketers from Gisborne, New Zealand